John Hewitt Judd (12 May 1899 – 23 December 1986) was an American ophthalmologist and numismatist. He was born in Dawson, Nebraska, studied at the University of Nebraska, and was professor of ophthalmology there from 1930 to 1964. He is best known, however, for his work on United States pattern coins, writing the definitive work, United States Pattern, Experimental, and Trial Pieces. Judd served as president of the American Numismatic Association from 1953 to 1955, and was awarded the Farran Zerbe Memorial Award in 1955. He also served on the 1965 Assay Commission.

References

1899 births
1986 deaths
People from Richardson County, Nebraska
American ophthalmologists
American numismatists
University of Nebraska alumni
University of Nebraska faculty
Members of the United States Assay Commission